The Sarda is an indigenous breed of domestic goat from the Mediterranean island of Sardinia, off the west coast of central Italy. It is raised throughout the island, particularly in the provinces of Cagliari and Nuoro. It is an ancient breed that has been influenced by the Maltese goat.

The Sarda is one of the eight autochthonous Italian goat breeds for which a genealogical herdbook is kept by the Associazione Nazionale della Pastorizia, the Italian national association of sheep- and goat-breeders. The herdbook was established in 1981.

Characteristics

The animals are of medium build, long-necked and deep-chested; the does have well-developed udders. The breed is particularly hardy and well-suited to being raised in a wild or semi-wild state in tough conditions. As much of the available pasture is used by the Sarda sheep, goats are marginalised and allowed only the poorest terrain; they are fed little or nothing over and above what they can graze.

Use

The milk yield of the Sarda per lactation of 220–240 days is  litres for primiparous,  litres for secondiparous, and  litres for pluriparous, nannies. The milk averages 3.94% protein, and is used to make Gioddu, a fermented milk product; Casu Axeddu, a mixed pecorino–caprino cheese; and ricotta.

References

Goat breeds
Dairy goat breeds
Sardinia
Goat breeds originating in Italy